María Fernanda Álvarez Terán (born 28 February 1989), also known as MFAT, is a former tennis player from Bolivia.

Álvarez was ranked No. 15 in the junior rankings in 2007. She won tournaments including doubles at the Copa Gatorade, Copa Milo in singles, Méditerranée Avenir in doubles, and Raquette D'Or, Riad 21, both in singles, and 21st Copa Gerdau and Condor de Plata, both in doubles.

On the senior tour, her best singles ranking was world No. 187, achieved in September 2009. On 7 April 2014, she peaked at No. 137 in the doubles rankings. Her last match on the ITF Women's Circuit she competed in her hometown Santa Cruz, in December 2016.

Playing for Bolivia Fed Cup team, Álvarez Terán has a win–loss record of 32–33.

ITF Circuit finals

Singles: 24 (12 titles, 12 runner-ups)

Doubles: 43 (24 titles, 19 runner-ups)

Notes

External links
 
 
 

1989 births
Living people
Bolivian female tennis players
Sportspeople from Santa Cruz de la Sierra
Tennis players at the 2015 Pan American Games
Tennis players at the 2011 Pan American Games
Pan American Games competitors for Bolivia
20th-century Bolivian women
21st-century Bolivian women